Postman's Knock is a 1962 British comedy film directed by Robert Lynn starring Spike Milligan, Barbara Shelley, John Wood and Warren Mitchell. The screenplay concerns a country postman who is transferred to London, where he manages to foil a major robbery.

According to MGM the film made a loss of $31,000.

Plot
Harold Petts is a conscientious village postman who receives a promotion that takes him to London to be trained at London's busiest post office. However, after his first day in the big city, he is soon in trouble.

In the main sorting office, he succeeds in beating the new mail sorting machine at pigeonholing letters for delivery (the machine blows up in the process). As a result, he is placed safely out of the way in the parcels department, but sorts parcels at such speed that he puts everyone else in the department out of work.

This leads him to a meeting with the staff psychiatrist, and then to Jean, an ambitious art student, and the pair find themselves the main suspects in a mail theft ring, with the police and post office officials hot on their heels.

Cast
 Spike Milligan - Harold Petts
 Barbara Shelley - Jean
 John Wood - P.C. Woods
 Archie Duncan - Inspector
 Warren Mitchell - Rupert
 Lance Percival - Joe
 Arthur Mullard - Sam
 John Bennett - Pete
 Ronald Adam - Mr. Fordyce
 Miles Malleson - Psychiatrist
 Wilfrid Lawson - Postman
 Mario Fabrizi - Villager
 Bob Todd - District Superintendent

Critical reception
Britmovie noted "several promising satirical opportunities are sadly lost beneath a welter of frenetic slapstick"; while David McGillivray described the film in the Radio Times as "one of two comedies (the other is Invasion Quartet) created for Spike Milligan by John Briley and Jack Trevor Story, talented writers not noted for their eccentric humour (Briley went on to script Gandhi and Cry Freedom). Consequently the brilliant Goon flounders in the conventional, happy-go-lucky tale of a village postman who is transferred to London."

References

External links
 
 
 

1962 films
1962 comedy films
1960s English-language films
Films directed by Robert Lynn
British comedy films
Metro-Goldwyn-Mayer films
Films scored by Ron Goodwin
British black-and-white films
Films set in London
Films with screenplays by John Briley
Films about postal systems
Films shot at MGM-British Studios
1960s British films